Abergele & Pensarn railway station is a railway station on the North Wales Coast Line which serves both the town of Abergele and suburb of Pensarn in Conwy County Borough, Wales.

History
Opened as Abergele by the Chester and Holyhead Railway on 1 May 1848, the 'and Pensarn' suffix was believed to have been added when the station was substantially rebuilt in 1883. It became part of the London, Midland and Scottish Railway during the Grouping of 1923. The line then passed on to the London Midland Region of British Railways on nationalisation in 1948.

When Sectorisation was introduced, the station was served by Regional Railways although Intercity Sector trains passed through on their way from London Euston to Holyhead.

The Privatisation of British Rail led to services being provided by Wales and Borders until 2003, Arriva Trains Wales until 2018, and in the present day, Transport for Wales.

The station had been the location of two LMS caravans in 1935 and 1936 followed by three caravans from 1937 to 1939. Nine camping coaches were positioned here by the London Midland Region from 1954 to 1971 (eight only in 1954).

It was originally served by loops off the main line in both directions, but the eastbound one was removed in the late 1980s and the main line realigned to pass through the platform. However the westbound one remained in use until early 2017 - it was decommissioned over the weekend of 8/9 January. The loop has now been lifted and the platform extended out to reach the remaining main line. A replacement bus service was provided to Rhyl whilst the work was in progress, as westbound trains were not to call until the work was completed. The platform reopened to traffic on 12 March 2017. As part of the same modernisation scheme, the signal box here was abolished in March 2018, when new colour light signalling was commissioned between Colwyn Bay and Shotton.

Abergele train disaster

On 20 August 1868, the Irish Mail collided with some runaway goods wagons which had been left on the running line between Abergele & Pensarn and Llandulas stations. The accident was, at the time, the worst railway disaster in Britain.

Facilities
The station is unstaffed and intending passengers must purchase tickets from the ticket vending machine on platform 2 prior to travel. The former ticket office next to platform 2 and the waiting rooms on each side still stand, but are no longer in rail use - waiting shelters are provided for passengers on each platform. Train running information is offered via CIS screens, customer help points and timetable poster boards, along with a payphone on platform 2. Step-free access is available to both platforms via ramps from the road bridge linking them.

Services
The station is served by an hourly service in each direction (weekdays) on the Manchester to Llandudno route operated by Transport for Wales and calling at Manchester Piccadilly, Manchester Oxford Road, Earlestown, Warrington Bank Quay, Frodsham, Helsby, Chester, Flint, Prestatyn, Rhyl, Colwyn Bay, Llandudno Junction, Deganwy and Llandudno. A few services between //Cardiff Central and  also call at peak periods and in the late evening.

On Sundays, the service is provided by Holyhead to Crewe trains, which call hourly each way from late afternoon (only certain trains call during the morning & early afternoon, resulting in sizeable gaps in the timetable).

References

Sources

Further reading

External links

 Abergele and Pensarn station on navigable O.S. map

Abergele
Railway stations in Conwy County Borough
DfT Category F1 stations
Former London and North Western Railway stations
Railway stations in Great Britain opened in 1848
Railway stations served by Transport for Wales Rail
Grade II listed buildings in Conwy County Borough
Grade II listed railway stations in Wales